The District Council of Yatala North was a local government area of South Australia on the central Adelaide Plains from 1868 to 1933. It was split from the abolished District Council of Yatala on 18 June 1868. The council area ranged approximately from Dry Creek in the south to the Little Para River in the north.

History

The council was established in 1868 when the District Council of Yatala was divided at the Dry Creek and the Dry Creek-Port Adelaide railway line into the District Councils of Yatala South and Yatala North.

On 22 June 1933, following a proposal by Local Government Areas Commission the Yatala North District Council was abolished and merged with a large portion of the adjacent to the north District Council of Munno Para West (which was abolished at the same time), to form the new District Council of Salisbury, which ultimately became the modern City of Salisbury.

See also
 Hundred of Yatala

Notes

1868 establishments in Australia
1933 disestablishments in Australia
Yatala North, District Council of